In the United Kingdom, there are time limits after which court actions cannot be taken in certain types of cases. These differ across the three legal systems in the United Kingdom. The United Kingdom has no statute of limitations for any criminal offence tried above magistrate level.

Civil
The key legislation relating to civil claims in England and Wales is the Limitation Act 1980, which lists the time to various types of cases.

Debt
If a lender allows six years to pass without receiving any payment, an action for recovery may become statute-barred.

Injury
The general time limit for injury litigation is three years, with multiple exceptions and special cases. The statute of limitations for injuries to children only starts at the eighteenth birthday. The statute of limitations for brain damage begins only when the victim has been medically acknowledged as regaining cognitive ability. The Montreal Convention (1999) and the Athens Convention (1974) govern the statute of limitations for compensation for injuries on an aeroplane or while at sea, respectively.

Libel
The limitation period for libel, slander, slander of title, slander of goods or other malicious falsehood is one year.

Criminal

Indicted offences
Unlike other European countries, the United Kingdom has no general statute of limitations for serious criminal offences, known as indictable offences (usually called a "felony" in the United States). This includes either-way offences that are prosecuted in Crown Court.

Following a number of acquittals and wrongful convictions of people charged with serious sexual crimes alleged to have been committed several decades prior, there has been some debate as to whether there should be a statute of limitations for historical rape and sexual assault cases, as prosecutions rely solely on personal testimonies and have no physical or scientific evidence due to the passage of time.

Summary and unindicted either-way offences
UK magistrates' courts hear summary and non-indicted either-way offences — generally, crimes that are punishable by a fine and/or by less than 6 months' imprisonment (usually called a "misdemeanor" or "infraction" in the United States).

Section 127 of the Magistrates' Courts Act 1980 states that normally:

Traffic
Section 1 of the Road Traffic Offenders Act 1988 requires a Notice of Intended Prosecution (NIP) to be served within 14 days of applicable offences being committed; if that does not occur, it may follow that any further action may be prevented. However, there are exceptions to the 14 day rule; for example, if the alleged offence was committed in a company car or the car was not being driven by the registered keeper of the vehicle, the police may make appropriate investigations. The date of the offence is excluded.

The onus is on the body issuing the Notice of Intended Prosecution (NIP) to ensure the Notice is served within 14 days. The definition of "served" has changed. Prior to 1994, NIPs were served by registered or recorded post, but in 1994, the Road Traffic Offenders Act 1988 was amended to allow for standard postal delivery. Several successful defences to a NIP have been conducted on the production of the envelope that contained the NIP in which the postmark on the envelope indicated to a court that the NIP could not have been received (served) within the 14 day limit.

Voting
Section 176 of the Representation of the People Act 1983 requires that proceedings for any offence under that act — impersonation, fraudlent voting, vote tampering, violating vote secrecy, publishing pre-closure exit polls, etc. — begin within one year of the offence being committed.

References

 
English criminal law